The 1951 Colorado Mines Orediggers football team was an American football team that represented the Colorado School of Mines in the Rocky Mountain Conference (RMC) during the 1951 college football season. In their fifth year under head coach Fritz S. Brennecke, the team compiled a 7–2 record (4–0 against conference opponents), outscored opponents by a total of 123 to 119, and won the RMC championship. It was the school's first conference title since 1939.

Four Colorado Mines players were selected to the first team on the All-Rocky Mountain Conference team selected by the Associated Press: end Tom Wyman (offensive unit) tackle Darrell Beckley (offensive unit); halfback Ron Bethurum (offensive unit); and tackle Bill Cooke (defensive unit). Other Mines players receiving votes included end John Volosi, guard Wally Arnold, center Adam Thomas, and back Ed Ziokowski.

Schedule

References

Colorado Mines
Colorado Mines Orediggers football seasons
Rocky Mountain Athletic Conference football champion seasons
Colorado Mines Orediggers football